Diego Andrés Mejía Campos (born October 12, 1983, in Querétaro City, Querétaro) is a Mexican former professional footballer who last played for Morelia of Liga MX.

External links
 
Diego Andrei Mejía Campo

1983 births
Living people
Association football midfielders
Club Celaya footballers
Querétaro F.C. footballers
Club León footballers
Dorados de Sinaloa footballers
Albinegros de Orizaba footballers
Toros Neza footballers
Atlético Morelia players
Club Tijuana footballers
Liga MX players
Ascenso MX players
Footballers from Querétaro
Sportspeople from Querétaro City
Mexican footballers